This partial list of city nicknames in Florida compiles the aliases, sobriquets and slogans that cities in Florida are known by (or have been known by historically), officially and unofficially, to local people, outsiders or their tourism boards or chambers of commerce. City nicknames can help in establishing a civic identity, helping outsiders recognize a community or attracting people to a community because of its nickname; promote civic pride; and build community unity. Nicknames and slogans that successfully create a new community "ideology or myth" are also believed to have economic value. Their economic value is difficult to measure, but there are anecdotal reports of cities that have achieved substantial economic benefits by "branding" themselves by adopting new slogans.

Some unofficial nicknames are positive, while others are derisive. The unofficial nicknames listed here have been in use for a long time or have gained wide currency.
Apopka – Indoor Foliage Capital of the World
Aventura – The City of Excellence
Bartow
 City of Oaks and Azaleas
 The City of Oaks
 The 'Tow
Belle Glade – Muck City
Boca Raton – A City for All Seasons
Boynton Beach - Btown
Bradenton - The Friendly City
Cape Coral – Waterfront Wonderland
Clewiston – America's Sweetest Town
Coconut Creek – Butterfly Capital of the World
Coral Gables – The City Beautiful
Coral Springs – Everything Under the Sun
Crestview – Hub City
DeLand – The Athens of Florida
Deltona – Florida's Bright Spot
Destin – The World's Luckiest Fishing Village
Eustis – The City of Bright Tomorrows
Fernandina Beach – Shark's Tooth Capital of the World
Fort Lauderdale – Venice of America
Fort Myers – The City of Palms
Fort Pierce – The Sunshine City
Fort Walton Beach 
Billfish Capital of the World
Emerald Coast
Gainesville
Hogtown
The Tree City
Rainesville
Gator Country
Haines City – The Heart of Florida
Hialeah – City of Progress
Jacksonville 
Jax
 Where Florida Begins
 Bold New City of the South
Key West
Conch Republic 
Southernmost City In The Continental United States 
Lakeland
Swan City
Largo
Dime City
Melbourne – The Harbor City
Miami – The Magic City
Navarre
Florida's Best Kept Secret
Florida's Most Relaxing Place
Florida's Playground
Ocala 
The Brick City
Horse Capital of the World (with Marion County) – the Florida Thoroughbred Breeders' and Owners' Association, obtained the trademark on behalf of Ocala and Marion County in the late 1990s. The title is disputed with Lexington, Kentucky, which also claims to be the "Horse Capital of the World."
Ocoee – The Center of Good Living
Okeechobee – Speckled Perch Capital of the World
Orlando
The City Beautiful
O-Town
Ormond Beach – Birthplace of Speed
Panama City Beach – The World's Most Beautiful Beaches
Pensacola – City of Five Flags
Plant City
Strawberry Capital of the World
Winter Strawberry Capital of the World
Port St. Lucie
PSL
A City for All Ages
St. Petersburg
Always in Season
The Burg
Sunshine City
St. PeteJenny Deam, Clearwater Times (St. Petersburg Times)"St. Pete Beach begins to address name change", accessed January 27, 2011
Sarasota – We Live Where You Vacation
Sebring – City on the Circle
Stuart – Sailfish Capital of the WorldDouglas Waitley, Best Backroads of Florida: Coasts, Glades, and Groves (2001). Pineapple Press: p. 35.
Tallahassee
Tally
TallanastyNicholas Gonzalez, Busting the myth of Tallanasty , FSU News (Jan. 9, 2012).
Tampa
The Big Guava
Cigar CityYbor City: Cigar Capital of the World , National Park Service, accessed April 12, 2007.
Lightning Capital of the WorldPorter, Arthur. "Looking back on fond years in Tampa Bay as the green, green grass of home beckons" , Tampa Bay Business Journal, January 26, 2007, accessed April 12, 2007. "I will have been in Tampa for four years in May, and I remember my first day -- one of the typical Tampa days in May.... "Welcome to the lightning capital of the world," my new colleagues declared."
Champa Bay, after multiple local pro sports franchises won championships in 2020 and 2021
Tarpon Springs – Sponge Capital of the World
Venice – Shark Tooth Capital of the World
West Palm Beach – Orchid City

See also
List of city nicknames in the United States
List of cities in Florida

References

External links
a list of American and a few Canadian nicknames
U.S. cities list

Florida cities
 
Nicknames of cities